Timan Garh is a historical fort of the Karauli State, situated near Masalpur in Karauli District on old Agra-Karauli highway  Indian state of Rajasthan.

The ASI, State Government and Central Government of India have taken no steps to preserve this fort and as a result, its about 50 temples (10 large) have been destroyed and dug up by local villagers. It’s a untouched and unexplored heritage of Rajasthan which still carries old sculptures (can be seen easily) while roaming around the fort. In early 90’s it used to be a dacoit area but now it’s safe for unexplored travel. In 2021, under #savetimangarh movement started by Shweta Sharma; new hopes has been raised for Timangarh preservation.

History
It was built by Timan or Tisman, a powerful ruler of 2nd Century A.D. who ruled over present day Rajasthan, Madhya Pradesh, Gujarat, Haryana and Western Uttar Pradesh. It is believed to have been occupied by the forces of Mohammad Ghori, the Sultan of Ghazni from 1196-1244 A.D. It was reconstructed in 1244 A.D. by Yaduvanshi Raja Timanpal, the scion of Vijay Pal, the Raja of Bayana. This fact has been supported by a stone engraving at the entrance of the Fort.

Architecture of Timangarh Fort
This Fort is spread over an area of 51.5 hectares approximately. Earlier, it was a very huge Fort, but now it is in a ruined state. It originally had five entrances to which some more gates were added by the Mughals. The gates built later on have stone blocks of different colors and variety and some stones slabs have writings on them. The remains of an ancient township with palaces, bazaars, houses and Temples can be seen inside the Fort Complex. The rooftops and the pillars of these structures are adorned with geometrical, religious and flower-patterned carvings. The sculptures of Gods and Goddesses and their tantric counterparts also adorn these pillars. The idols recovered from the area belong to Hindu, Jain community and are mostly of Lord Ganesha and Lord Vishnu.

References

Forts in Rajasthan
Hindaun Block
Tourist attractions near Hindaun
Tourist attractions in Karauli district